Interstate 474 (I-474) is an Interstate Highway loop route that provides a southwestern bypass around the north-central Illinois city of Peoria. I-474's parent Interstate is I-74. As the first digit of the Interstate's number is even, it follows the established convention of providing a loop around a city. I-474 is the highest numbered route in the state of Illinois. It is also, excluding the proposed I-274 in North Carolina, the only auxiliary route of I-74.

Route description 

I-474 is a modern, Interstate-standard four-lane freeway for its entire length. Prior to 2006, through truck traffic on I-74 was instructed to use I-474.

The Illinois Route 116 (IL 116) access interchange at Maxwell Road has been indicated as the eastern terminus for the Quincy to Peoria expressway now known as the IL 336 project.

The western terminus of I-474 is at I-74 exit 87A.  The eastern terminus of I-474 is at I-74 exit 99.  North of the western terminus, the road continues as IL 6 with a new series of exit numbers.

History 
I-474 was constructed through the mid-1970s. The now-named Shade–Lohmann Bridge was erected in 1973. During that year, $30.1 million (equivalent to $ in ) was allocated for acquisition of right-of-way, grading work, and overpass/bridge construction across the whole length of the highway.

Exit list

References

External links 

 Illinois Highway Ends: Interstate 474

74-4
74-4
Transportation in Peoria County, Illinois
Transportation in Tazewell County, Illinois
4